Yusuf Türk (born 13 February 1998) is a Turkish professional footballer who plays at Somaspor on loan from Gaziantep as a winger.

Career

Club
A youth product of Foça Belediyespor and Fenerbahçe, Türk signed his first professional contract with Gaziantep on 31 August 2018. He began his career with successive loans to Ofspor, Kastamonuspor and Karacabey Belediyespor. He made his professional debut with Gaziantep in a 3–0 Süper Lig loss to Trabzonspor on 22 February 2021, coming on as a late sub in the 72nd minute.

References

External links
 

Living people
1998 births
Footballers from İzmir
Turkish footballers
Turkey youth international footballers
Association football wingers
Gaziantep F.K. footballers
Ofspor footballers
Kastamonuspor footballers
Karacabey Belediyespor footballers
Bursaspor footballers
Süper Lig players
TFF First League players
TFF Second League players
TFF Third League players